Sebastian Fiedler (born 19 June 1973) is a German politician. He is a member of the SPD and has been the Member of the German Bundestag for Mülheim – Essen I since 2021.

Early life 
Fiedler was born in Herdecke and grew up in Wetter.

Career 
Before entering politics, Fiedler formerly worked as a police officer.

See also 

 List of members of the 20th Bundestag

References 

1973 births
Living people
People from Ennepe-Ruhr-Kreis
German police officers
German trade unionists
21st-century German politicians
Members of the Bundestag for North Rhine-Westphalia

German Protestants
Members of the Bundestag 2021–2025
Members of the Bundestag for the Social Democratic Party of Germany
People from Mülheim